Mount Allen is a mountain (3,430 m) located 5.2 mi southeast of Mount Craddock in Owen Ridge, the southernmost portion of the main ridge of Sentinel Range, Ellsworth Mountains in Antarctica.  The peak surmounts Saltzman Glacier to the north, Kornicker Glacier to the southeast, Bolgrad Glacier to the southwest and Brook Glacier to the west. It was mapped by the USGS from surveys and USN air photos in 1957–59. It was named by the US-ACAN for Lt. Forrest M. Allen, USNR, the co-pilot on reconnaissance flights from Byrd Station, 1957–58. Mount Allen was first successfully climbed on December 26, 2012, by Pachi Ibarra, Ralf Laier and Todd Passey.

See also
 Mountains in Antarctica

Maps
 Vinson Massif.  Scale 1:250 000 topographic map.  Reston, Virginia: US Geological Survey, 1988.
 Antarctic Digital Database (ADD). Scale 1:250000 topographic map of Antarctica. Scientific Committee on Antarctic Research (SCAR). Since 1993, regularly updated.

References
 Mount Allen. SCAR Composite Antarctic Gazetteer

Ellsworth Mountains
Mountains of Ellsworth Land